John Hancock (1735–1793) was an American merchant, statesman, and prominent Patriot of the American Revolution.

John Hancock may also refer to:

People
John Hancock Sr. (1671–1752), American clergyman and paternal grandfather of the U.S. statesman
John Hancock Jr. (1702–1744), American clergyman and father of the U.S. statesman
John Hancock (ornithologist) (1808–1890), British naturalist
John Hancock (Texas politician) (1824–1893), American judge and politician
John Hancock (Australian politician) (1846–1899), Australian trade unionist and politician
John Hancock (British politician) (1857–1940), British Liberal Party politician
John Milton Hancock (1883–1956), American engineer, navy man and manager
John W. Hancock (1901–1993), American football player, athlete and coach
John E. Hancock (1903–1982), American farmer and politician in Vermont
John Hancock (venereologist) (1923–1974), British venereologist and editor
John D. Hancock (born 1939), American film director
John Hancock (actor) (1941–1992), American actor
John Lee Hancock (born 1956), American screenwriter
John Hancock (Australian businessman) (born 1976), West Australian mining magnate
John Hancock (silversmith), American silversmith
John Hancock, member of the Late Night Alumni
John Hancock, a man shot by Alvin and Judith Neelley

Fictional
John Hancock, the main character in the film Hancock
John Hancock, a companion in Fallout 4

Other uses
USS John Hancock (DD-981), a U.S. destroyer in service 1979–2000
USS John Hancock (1850), a U.S. naval tug in service 1850s
John Hancock, used in the United States as a synonym for a signature
John Hancock Bowl, a college football bowl game played from 1989 to 1993 in El Paso, Texas
John Hancock Building, the name of three different buildings in Boston, Massachusetts (includes the John Hancock Tower, below)
John Hancock Center, a building in Chicago, Illinois
John Hancock Financial, a US subsidiary of Manulife
John Hancock Tower, a building in Boston, Massachusetts

See also
Jonathan Hancock (born 1972), British radio presenter and memory expert
Johnny Hancocks (1919–1994), English footballer for Wolves
John Handcock (disambiguation)